ToJ was a German racing car constructor, founded by Jörg Obermoser.
Obermoser began with selling open wheel racing cars for Formula Two and Formula Three, and later diversified into sports racing cars. New designs continued until 1982 with the final ToJ SC390 car powered by a Cosworth DFV for Group C sportscar racing for the World Endurance Championship and the Germany-based Interserie. 

References 

German racecar constructors
German auto racing teams
Formula Two constructors